To kiss hands is a constitutional term used in the United Kingdom to refer to the formal installation of the prime minister or other Crown-appointed government ministers to their office.

Overview
In the past, the term referred to the requirement that the office-holder to actually kiss the hands of the monarch as a symbol of personal fealty and loyalty, that fealty and loyalty being a requirement to serve in the King's or Queen's government.
 
In modern times, office-holders are not expected to physically kiss the hands of the monarch before assuming the role, neither at this ceremony nor at any other point in the process of installing a new office-holder. Simply being received by the monarch is taken to validate the selection, with this meeting being described in the Court Circular as "kissing hands". The invitation issued to a party leader to form a government is sometimes still described as "an invitation to kiss hands". The metaphorical kissing of hands (i.e. the appointment) does not legally take place until the subsequent meeting of the Privy Council, when the new minister is formally appointed as a member of the Council.

When appointing a Secretary of State (the top rank in the UK government), the protocol also involves the delivery by the King or Queen of the seals of office into the hands of the appointee. This is also valid for other officers who are keepers of seals, such as the Lord Privy Seal or the Lord Chancellor, who is also keeper of the Great Seal of the United Kingdom.

History

The ceremony usually takes place in Buckingham Palace, but it has been known to happen in Windsor Castle or Balmoral Castle. More unusually, in April 1908, Edward VII summoned H. H. Asquith out of the country to the Hôtel du Palais, Biarritz, France, where the King was on holiday at the time. 

In his autobiography, Tony Blair recalled being confused by the fact that the ceremony did not involve literally kissing Queen Elizabeth II's hands, being instead told to "brush them [the hands] gently with your lips". When he was ushered into the room to meet the Queen, Blair tripped on a piece of carpet and fell onto the Queen's hands.

Due to the failing health of Elizabeth II, the 2022 kissing hands ceremony of Liz Truss took place at Balmoral, where the Queen was spending the summer, marking the only time in her 70-year reign that the ceremony did not take place at Buckingham Palace. It was the Queen's last official act before her death two days later. This was the first time the ceremony took place at Balmoral since 1885, when Lord Salisbury began his first stint as prime minister.

See also
Audience (meeting)#United Kingdom
Hand-kissing#Kissing the ring

References

Further reading
 How is a Prime Minister appointed? from the House of Commons Library.
 

British Prime Minister's Office
State ritual and ceremonies
British monarchy
Kissing
Buckingham Palace
Ceremonies in the United Kingdom